Anomala innuba is a species of shining leaf chafer in the family of beetles known as Scarabaeidae.

Subspecies
These two subspecies belong to the species Anomala innuba:
 Anomala innuba innuba g
 Anomala innuba piceola Casey, 1915 c g
Data sources: i = ITIS, c = Catalogue of Life, g = GBIF, b = Bugguide.net

References

Further reading

External links

 

Rutelinae
Articles created by Qbugbot
Beetles described in 1787